The Firema T-68 was a model of light rail passenger vehicle first operated on the Manchester Metrolink network in Greater Manchester, England in 1992. It was constructed by Firema specifically as a high-floor, articulated bi-directional tram to operate solely on the Manchester Metrolink system.

Twenty-six T-68s were manufactured by Firema at their factories in Italy. Six modified variants (known as the T-68A) were produced in 1999 in a joint project by Firema and Ansaldo. All 32 were replaced by Bombardier M5000s between 2012 and 2014.

T-68
The first 26 T-68s were built in 1991 by Firema with bodyshells constructed at various plants in Casaralta (8), Casertane (7), Cittadella (4) and Fiore (7). Bogies and the central articulation sections were constructed at Firema's Padova plant (which was later responsible for the construction of the T68A vehicles).  
The first T68 to be delivered to Manchester was 1001, arriving 29 August 1991; this was the only T68 to be delivered as a complete unit with the others arriving in separate consignments with each bodyshell and bogies being assembled at Queens Road depot.

The T-68s entered service on 6 April 1992. As low-floor tram technology was in its infancy at the time, Metrolink was in its planning stages, and in order to be compatible with standard height railway platforms used by Metrolink, the vehicles were high-floor, using the same  platform height as British Rail trains. In the beginning, several stops in the city centre (and ) had dual height platforms, with one high part and one lower part. The T-68s were therefore equipped with retractable steps to allow passengers to use the lower section of the platform. The dual height platforms have since been either rebuilt as high level platforms or removed. The T-68s could operate either as single units, or coupled together in pairs.

The fleet later received various modifications, including electronic destination displays instead of destination blinds, retractable couplers, covered bogies, internal electronic displays, CCTV in place of mirrors and several other electronic modifications. Fifteen were later fitted with air-conditioning.

Vehicle 1022 underwent an interior modification layout trial in 1995 that saw non-standard seating fitted with higher backs and more rounded grab handles. The seats were set in a longitudinal layout to provide for more standing passengers and increase the overall capacity. The trial was unpopular with passengers and the tram was later refitted with standard seats in the original layout. The trial seats were retained and in March 2003 were fitted to vehicle 1007.

The final three T-68s: 1007, 1016 and 1022 were withdrawn on 10 February 2014.

T-68A
Ahead of the opening of the Phase 2 line to Eccles Line, six new vehicles were ordered and constructed in 1999. Bodyshells were again built by Firema, this time at the plant in Stanga, Italy. Traction equipment was built by Ansaldo at the Padova facility, where assembly of the vehicles was completed.

The six T-68As entered service on the Eccles Line at its opening in 1999, numbered 2001–2006. They were similar to the original fleet, but built with modifications to allow for a high proportion of street running on the Eccles Line with other traffic. These included retractable couplers and covered bogies, as well as electronic destination displays instead of destination blinds. Three of the original fleet (1005, 1010 and 1015) also received the same modifications to allow them to run alongside the new T-68As. Subsequently, all bar 1018 - 1020 were similarly modified. Originally, the T-68As were only authorised to run between Eccles, Piccadilly and the Queens Road depot, but from 2009 they were modified to allow running on all lines. The T-68A trams only ever operated as single units.

After developing a fault with the emergency brakes applying regularly without instruction to do so, 2001 was stored for several years from 2006. It was completely rewired and returned to service in June 2011. The final two T-68As, 2001 and 2003, were withdrawn on 30 April 2014.

Livery
The trams were originally liveried in white, with a grey skirt, and a turquoise strip running along the skirt. Later modifications of this livery included the doors also being painted turquoise, and a turquoise strip painted along the top of the body, with thin orange or yellow lines separating the turquoise stripes and the white body. Only 1003 received the yellow and grey Metrolink livery introduced when the first M5000s entered service.

Names
All 32 of the T-68s and T-68As at some point had name plates, named after famous Mancunian people, achievements, retired Workers, places or company sponsorship.
1000 The Larry Sullivan (Prototype)
1001 System One, Childrens Hospital Appeal I
1002 Manchester Arndale Voyager, Da vinci, Manchester Arndale Voyager, The Mary Sumner, Virgin Megastores
1003 Once Upon a Wartime - Imperial War Museum North, Vans. The Original since 1966, Childrens Hospital Appeal II, The Robert Owen
1004 Vans. The Original since 1966, The Robert Owen
1005 Sooty and Co, Greater Altrincham Enterprise, The Railway Mission
1006 Vans. The Original since 1966
1007 East Lancashire Railway, Red nose day 09, The Guinness Record Breaker, Air Malta
1008 Manchester Airport, Erotica G-Mex 2004, Steve Hyde
1009 CIS 125 Special, Co-Operative Insurance, Virgin Megastores
1010 Manchester Champion, West One, Golden Jubilee 2002
1011 Sponsored by Tesco, Superb, Virgin Megastores, System One
1012 Kerry, Cathrine Hallet, Virgin Megastores
1013 The Fusilier, The Grandier Guardsman
1014 Vans. The Original since 1966, Manchester 2000, The Great Manchester Runner, The city of Drama, Margret Richardson, Brian “Kidder” Samuels
1015 Sparky, Magic 1152, Skill City, Burma Star
1016 Signal Express, Erotica G-Mex 2004, Virgin Megastores, Farewell T68
1017 Rosie, Bury Hospice
1018 Sir Matt Busby, Waterstones Manchester Arndale, The Hire Flyer, Electra, The Co-oprative Food
1019 The Eric Black
1020 Lancashire Fusilier, The David Graham CBE, Mary Poppins
1021 The Greater Manchester Radio, Sony Centre Arndale, Starlight Express
1022 The Poppy Appeal, The Graham Ashworth, The Manchester Evening News
1023 Mike Mabey 
1024 The John Greenwood, Jeff Jardine 
1025 Christie Metro Challenger, Fred G Fitter 
1026 The Power
2001 The Joe Clarke OBE, West One
2002 Sony Centre Arndale
2003 Traveller 2000, Dave Hansford
2004 Salford Lads’ Club
2005 Wh-Smith West One
2006 City of Salford 2000, West One, Sony Centre Arndale

Withdrawal
In 2008, the entire T-68/T-68A fleet underwent a refurbishment programme, which was designed to keep them in service for at least another 10 years. However, the newer Bombardier M5000 trams introduced from 2009 proved to be considerably more reliable than the T-68/T-68A fleet; which averaged  between breakdowns, while the M5000 trams at introduction averaged . The M5000 trams are also 10 tonnes lighter than the T-68s/T-68As, causing less track wear, and using less energy. In addition to this, many of the T-68s were found to be suffering from corrosion to their solebars, which would have required further expensive repairs to keep them in service. 

In July 2012, Transport for Greater Manchester decided that it would be more cost effective to withdraw all of the T-68s/T-68As and replace them with M5000s with the first T-68 withdrawn in 2012. The final three T68s were withdrawn on 10 February 2014 and the last two T-68As on 30 April 2014.

To bid farewell to the T-68s, on 26 May 2014 a farewell tour was operated by 1007 and 1016, the former being the first tram to run through the city streets when it opened in 1992.

Preservation and further use

The Manchester Transport Museum Society owns T-68s 1007 and 1023. The former was chosen as it was the first tram to run through Manchester city centre on the system's opening on 27 April 1992 and is destined for the Heaton Park Tramway. 1007 was the number carried by the tram that operated the final Manchester Corporation Tramways service in 1949. In March 2020, 1023 was moved for display at Crewe Heritage Centre until it could be accommodated at Heaton Park. while 1007 resides in undercover storage at Trafford depot.

Greater Manchester Fire and Rescue Service purchased 1003 for use as a training rig at its training facility in Bury. 

Four of the trams (1016, 1022, 1024 and 1026) were transferred to the tram test centre at Long Marston.

A single car prototype bodyshell numbered 1000 was built in Italy in 1990 and delivered to Manchester for public exhibition to promote the system. It is now preserved and displayed at the Museum of Transport, Greater Manchester.

In popular culture
In December 2010, T-68 1015 was used in the 50th anniversary live episode of the television programme Coronation Street, to portray a tram crash on the street. As well as a mock-up tram for scenes after the crash, real life T-68 1015 was also used, numbered as 1030 and temporarily vinyl wrapped in the new yellow and grey livery. Trams 1019 and 2001 appeared in the 2001 comedy drama The Parole Officer starring Steve Coogan but the lengthy scene featuring 1019 was eventually cut.

Accidents and incidents
On 12 August 1996, 1006 was involved in a collision with a HGV which had gone through a red traffic light on Corporation Street, near Victoria station. The force of the impact derailed the B car of the tram but there were no serious injuries to the driver or passengers. The damaged carriage was repaired at Metro-Cammell Works in Washwood Heath, with the tram returning to service just over four months later, on 16 December 1996.

On 10 November 2005, the pantograph of vehicle 1022 detached while in service. Investigations found that a brick, which had been thrown at the tram from a bridge on the Bury Line, jammed underneath the pantograph, causing it to detach as it retracted to match lower overhead wires outside of the city centre.

On 22 March 2006, tram 1011 derailed as it entered a section of street running at Long Millgate near Victoria station. There were no injuries nor damage caused. The derailment was attributed to the failure of a repaired section of track at the interface between on- and off-street running.

On 17 January 2007, 1005 derailed on a curve at Pomona station. The RAIB concluded this was due to insufficient maintenance of the tracks by the contracted operator, Serco, which led to the tracks slowly moving apart until they were out of gauge.

On 1 February 2007, 1013 split a set of points while being moved at Queens Road depot. This caused the tram to end up diagonally, across two tracks. None of the bogies were derailed in the incident.

On 29 June 2008, 1016 derailed as the rear vehicle of a double consist while crossing Princess Street near St Peter's Square. The derailment was attributed to insufficient maintenance by the previous operator, Serco. Damage was caused to tram 1016 as well as the overhead line at the point of the derailment. Tram 1008, the other vehicle, was not damaged in the incident.  

On 5 June 2011, tram 1002 struck a pedestrian on Piccadilly Gardens. The person died at the Manchester Royal.

Gallery

References

External links

Metrolink Trams at thetrams.co.uk

Light rail vehicles
Manchester Metrolink
Tram vehicles of the United Kingdom
Tram transport in Greater Manchester
Train-related introductions in 1992
Train-related introductions in 1999
Breda trams
Breda multiple units
750 V DC multiple units